Nassim Amaarouk (born 1 April 1996) is a Dutch footballer who plays as a midfielder.

Club career
Starting his senior career with NEC, Amaarouk was sent on loan to Achilles '29 in 2017. He made his professional debut in the Eerste Divisie for the club on 6 February 2017 in a game against FC Eindhoven.

In April 2019, Amaarouk signed with BVV Barendrecht after playing one season for VV Capelle in the Hoofdklasse. He left the club again after one season due to injuries, in February 2020.

References

External links
 
 

1996 births
Footballers from Rotterdam
Living people
Dutch footballers
NEC Nijmegen players
Achilles '29 players
Eerste Divisie players
Vierde Divisie players
Helmond Sport players
SC Feyenoord players
VV Capelle players
BVV Barendrecht players
Association football midfielders